Simon Hammer (born 2 March 1983) is a Danish handball player, currently playing for Danish Handball League side FCK Håndbold. He has previously played for another league side HF Mors.

External links
 player info

1983 births
Living people
Danish male handball players